Dan Dorman (born October 16, 1962) is a Minnesota politician and was a member of the Minnesota House of Representatives from 1999-2007.  Dorman, a Republican, who represented District 27A, which includes all or portions of Freeborn and Mower counties in the southeastern part of the state.

Early life, education, and career
Dorman graduated from Albert Lea High School in 1981.  From 1981-1982 he attended Riverland Community College.  Dorman attended the University of Minnesota in the Minneapolis–Saint Paul metro area.  He graduated in 1985 with a B.A. in Political Science.  In 1988, Dorman became an active manager of Hanson Tire Service, a Goodyear Tire Retailer.  He is currently the owner of the business.  
After his service in the Legislature, Dorman served as the executive director of the Albert Lea Economic Development Agency (Albert Lea Port Authority) from July 2007-October 2013.  In 2013, Dorman became Executive Director of the Greater Minnesota Partnership, an organization focused on advocating for Greater Minnesota economic development. Dorman spends some time lobbying the Minnesota Legislature for the Partnership.  Dorman also serves as a member of the boards of the Riverland Community College Foundation and the Albert Lea Community Foundation.

Minnesota House of Representatives

Elections
Dorman was first elected to the House in 1998, defeating Glenville-Emmons High School Counselor Paul Moore.  He was re-elected in 2000, 2002, and 2004.  He decided to not run for re-election in 2006.

Committee assignments
For the 84th Legislative Session, Dorman was part of the:
Capital Investment Committee (Chair)
Taxes Committee
Ways and Means Committee

For the 83rd Legislative Session, Dorman was part of the:
Commerce, Jobs, and Economic Development 
Economic Development and Tourism Division Subcommittee
Jobs and Economic Development Finance Committee (Vice-Chair)
Taxes Committee

For the 82nd Legislative Session, Dorman was part of the:
Agriculture and Rural Development Finance Committee
Agriculture and Rural Development Policy Committee
Taxes Committee
Sales and Income Tax Division Subcommittee

For the 81st Legislative Session, Dorman was a part of the:
Agriculture Policy Committee
Jobs and Economic Development Policy Committee
Taxes Committee
Property Taxes Division Subcommittee

Tenure
Dorman was first sworn in on January 5, 1999, serving until January 2, 2007.  He served in the 81st, 82nd, 83rd, and 84th Minnesota Legislatures.  Dorman was able to get the Albert Lea local option sales tax passed and secured funding for the cleanup of the closed landfill at Edgewater Park, funding for the Blazing Star Bike Trail, a grant to the City of Albert Lea for library improvements, a $500,000 grant to Freeborn County for County Road 46, and a grant to Freeman Township for improvements to the road into the Exol development park.  He was also a co-author of the JOBZ legislation.  Dorman was recognized five times by the Coalition of Greater Minnesota Cities for his work on behalf of Greater Minnesota, including receiving their Legacy Award when he chose not to run for re-election in 2006.

Personal life
Dorman is married to his wife, Mary Jo.  They have 2 kids, Chris and Matt. The Dormans reside in Albert Lea, MN.  Dorman is an avid Minnesota Golden Gophers fan.

References

External links 

http://votesmart.org/candidate/biography/20324/dan-dorman#.VMnxlEfF_T8

1962 births
Living people
People from Albert Lea, Minnesota
Republican Party members of the Minnesota House of Representatives
University of Minnesota College of Liberal Arts alumni
American Lutherans
21st-century American politicians